Richard J Nicholson (born 22 November 1937) is a retired British rower. He competed in the men's coxless pair event at the 1960 Summer Olympics. He was selected to represent Britain again at the 1966 World Rowing Championships partnering R C Waite in the coxless pair, they finished in 11th place overall after a fifth place finish in the B final.

References

1937 births
Living people
British male rowers
Olympic rowers of Great Britain
Rowers at the 1960 Summer Olympics
Sportspeople from Nottingham